Salkımlı or Fırki is a village in the District of Kulp, Diyarbakır Province, Turkey. In 2008 its population was 733 people. Before the Armenian genocide it was populated by Armenians and was the center of the group of villages known as Khian or Khiank ( or ).

References

Villages in Kulp District